Etienne Janeke (born 17 November 1998) is a South African rugby union player for the  in the Currie Cup. His regular position is prop.

Janeke was named in the  side for the 2021 Currie Cup Premier Division.

References

South African rugby union players
Living people
Rugby union props
Pumas (Currie Cup) players
1998 births
Rugby union players from Port Elizabeth
Griffons (rugby union) players